Ultimate is a compilation album by the Canadian singer-songwriter Bryan Adams, released on 3 November 2017, which contains songs he recorded from 1980 through 2017. The album also contains two new songs, "Ultimate Love" and "Please Stay" and was promoted with a tour.

Track listing

Charts

Certifications

References 

Bryan Adams albums
2017 compilation albums